Harpa lorenzi is a species of sea snail, a marine gastropod mollusk, in the family Harpidae.

Description
The length of the shell attains 44 mm.

Distribution
This species occurs in Natal.

References

Endemic fauna of South Africa
lorenzi
Gastropods described in 2018